Arval may refer to:

The Arval Brethren, a body of priests in ancient Rome
Arvals, a funeral dinner; also a cake served at such feasts 
, a US Navy patrol vessel in commission from 1917 to 1919
Arval, a vehicle financial services provider that is a subsidiary of BNP Paribas